The sixth and final season of the American television sitcom The Nanny aired on CBS from September 30, 1998, to June 23, 1999. The series was created by actress Fran Drescher and her-then husband Peter Marc Jacobson, and developed by Prudence Fraser and Robert Sternin. Produced by Sternin and Fraser Ink Inc., Highschool Sweethearts and TriStar Television, the series features Drescher, Jacobson, Fraser, Sternin, Caryn Lucas and Diane Wilk as executive producers.

Based on an idea inspired by Drescher's visit with a friend and The Sound of Music, the season revolves around Fran Fine, a Jewish woman from Flushing, Queens, New York, who is hired by a wealthy Broadway producer to be the nanny to his three children. Drescher stars as the titular character, Charles Shaughnessy as British-born producer Maxwell Sheffield, and the children – Maggie, Brighton and Grace – portrayed by Nicholle Tom, Benjamin Salisbury, and Madeline Zima. The series also features Daniel Davis as Niles, the family butler, and Lauren Lane as C.C. Babcock, Maxwell's associate in his production company who is smitten with him. Several recurring characters also played a role in the sitcoms plotlines, many of whom were related to Fran.

The opening sequence changed slightly in this season. Producer Kathy Landsburg was promoted to co-executive producer of the series as her producer credit was moved to the in-show credits, while the creator credits of Drescher and Jacobson, and the developer credits of Sternin and Fraser were added in its place.

Beginning with this season, Renée Taylor, Ann Guilbert and Rachel Chagall are credited as "starring" during the in-show credits.

During the show's original run this season, the show went on a hiatus after the episode "California Here We Come" with the two-part finale airing several weeks later in May. However, six further first-run episodes aired in June, disrupting the chronological continuance of the show. This was remedied in syndication when the two-part finale was moved after the last aired episode from the first-run ("The Baby Shower").

Rachel Chagall was pregnant through half the season.

Cast and characters

Main
 Fran Drescher as Fran Fine
 Charles Shaughnessy as Maxwell Sheffield
 Daniel Davis as Niles
 Lauren Lane as Chastity Claire "C.C" Babcock
 Nicholle Tom as Maggie Sheffield
 Benjamin Salisbury as Brighton Sheffield
 Madeline Zima as Grace Sheffield
 Renée Taylor as Sylvia Fine
 Rachel Chagall as Val Toriello
 Ann Morgan Guilbert as Yetta Rosenberg

Recurring
 Steve Lawrence as Morty Fine
 Andrew Levitas as Michael
 Nora Dunn as Dr. Reynolds

Guest stars
 Ray Abruzzo as Chopper Pilot
 Tawny Moyer as Nurse
 Chad Everett as Dr. Osborn
 Fred Stoller as Fred, the pharmacist
 Chris Bruno as Ski Instructor
 Sophie Ward as Jocelyn Sheffield
 Maxwell Caulfield as Rodney Pembroke
 James McDonnell as Colin
 Dakin Matthews as Dean Sterrett
 Anne Lambton as Madeline Porter
 Renee Cohen as Young Yetta
 Darryl Hickman as Priest
 Morty Drescher as Uncle Stanley
 Sylvia Drescher as Aunt Rose

Special guest stars
 Ray Stricklyn as Wendell Kent
 Bob Goen as himself
 Diane Baker as Roberta
 George Coe as Ernest
 Margaret Cho as Caryn
 Whoopi Goldberg as herself
 Tom Bergeron as himself
 Coolio  as himself
 Estelle Getty as herself
 Howie Mandel as himself
 Martin Mull as himself
 Caroline Rhea as herself
 Rita Rudner as herself / Margot
 Bruce Vilanch as himself
 Chris Elliott as Chris Malley
 Ray Charles as Sammy
 Lainie Kazan as Aunt Freida
 Lynn Redgrave as herself
 Donna Douglas as herself
 Hal Linden as Maury Sherry
 Joseph Bologna as Dr. Joe Razzo

Episodes

References

External links
 

1998 American television seasons
1999 American television seasons
The Nanny